The Carthage, Watertown and Sackets Harbor Railroad was incorporated in 1871 with the route itself  opening for operation in 1875.  It was built within the village of Sackets Harbor on the railbed of the former Sackets Harbor and Ellisburg Railroad.  It was incorporated into the New York Central Railroad in 1893. It ceased operating in 1949. It went from Sackets Harbor eastward to join the  Rome, Watertown and Ogdensburg Railroad at Watertown.

External links
The Carthage, Watertown & Sackets Harbor Railroad

Defunct New York (state) railroads
Predecessors of the New York Central Railroad
Railway companies established in 1875
Railway companies disestablished in 1913
1875 establishments in New York (state)